Muhd Noor Firdaus Ar Rasyid  (born 22 October 1996) is a sprinter from Brunei, who specializes in the 200 metres.

He competed in 200 metres at the 2017 and 2019 World Athletics Championships, where he ran a time of 21.99 seconds.

He currently holds the national record for the men’s 200 m event with a time of 21.39 s, which he achieved at the 2017 Southeast Asian Games.

References 

Living people
1996 births
Bruneian male sprinters
Athletes (track and field) at the 2020 Summer Olympics
Olympic athletes of Brunei